Bedroom Community is an Icelandic record label/collective which was founded in 2006 by producer Valgeir Sigurðsson, alongside fellow artists Nico Muhly and Ben Frost, later adding more artists to the roster. Based on the outskirts of Reykjavík, Iceland, Bedroom Community is also the home of Greenhouse Studios.

Bedroom Community was described by Drowned in Sound as "one of the best guarantors of quality, even importance, out there" known for its "emotionally powerful music". The Line Of Best Fit has described the label as 'more of an ecosystem cultivating music than a traditional record label', claiming that 'within ten years they've gone from being a side concern for a bunch of preternaturally talented composers and producers to become one of the most respected record labels in... the world?'

In 2011, Pierre-Alain Giraud made a documentary film called Everything Everywhere All The Time, which follows Sam Amidon, Ben Frost, Nico Muhly and Valgeir Sigurðsson on their collective tour, showcasing the music they've collaborated on and released individually under the Bedroom Community umbrella. The documentary was premiered at the Reykjavík International Film Festival, followed by screenings at CPH:DOX, Iceland Airwaves and more.

In 2016, to celebrate the label's 10th anniversary, a number of artists embarked on another Whale Watching Tour - this time travelling to the USA. Bedroom Community founder Valgeir Sigurðsson commented that:
"The Whale Watching Tour is an opportunity to manifest what we, as a record label and a collective of disparate musical personalities, do...to create something uniquely belonging to the live experience, from source material that is very familiar to us.These shows are fuelled by joyful energy and appreciation for each other, but also tension, blood and sweat that makes it all the more rewarding at the end of the day."

At Iceland Airwaves 2016, Bedroom Community showcased their back catalogue with Crash Ensemble, the Iceland Symphony Orchestra and conductor André De Ridder at Harpa.

Artists
 Valgeir Sigurðsson
 Nico Muhly
 Ben Frost
 Sam Amidon
 Daníel Bjarnason
 Puzzle Muteson
 Nadia Sirota
 James McVinnie
 Emily Hall
 Paul Corley

Releases
2021: Valgeir Sigurðsson: Kvika2020: Lyra Pramuk: Fountain2020: Tilman Robinson: Culturecide2019: Viktor Orri Árnason & Yair Elazar Glotman: Vast2019: Daniel Pioro: Dust2019: Costyoume: Pan2018: Nakata7: Cholera2018: Sam Slater: Wrong Airport Ghost2018: Puzzle Muteson: Swum2018: aYia: aYia2017: Valgeir Sigurðsson: Dissonance2017: Crash Ensemble: Ghosts2017: Nadia Sirota: Tessellatum2017: James McVinnie: Cycles_12016: Ben Frost: The Wasp Factory2016: aYia: Water Plant2016: Nico Muhly: Keep In Touch2016: Nico Muhly & Valgeir Sigurðsson: Scent Opera2015: Jodie Landau and Wild Up: You of All Things2015: Emily Hall: Folie à Deux2014: Ben Frost: V A R I A N T2014: Puzzle Muteson: Theatrics2014: Ben Frost: A U R O R A2013: Daníel Bjarnason: Over Light Earth2013: James McVinnie: Cycles2013: Frost & Sigurðsson & Muhly & Amidon: "Everything Everywhere All The Time" / "Whale Watching Tour"
2013: Nadia Sirota: Baroque2012: Nico Muhly: Drones2012: Paul Corley: Disquiet2012: Valgeir Sigurðsson: Architecture of Loss2011: Ben Frost & Daníel Bjarnason: Sólaris2011: Puzzle Muteson: En Garde2010: Nico Muhly: I Drink The Air Before Me2010: Sam Amidon: I See The Sign2010: Valgeir Sigurðsson: Draumalandið2010: Daníel Bjarnason: Processions2009: Ben Frost: By The Throat2008: Nico Muhly: Mothertongue2007: Sam Amidon: All is Well2007: Valgeir Sigurðsson: Ekvílíbrium2007: Ben Frost: Theory of Machines2006: Nico Muhly: Speaks Volumes''

Praise
"The best record label in the whole of Iceland and maybe even the entire world."
"The influential Bedroom Community label: a lightning rod at the juncture where the ambition of classical music meets the aesthetics of indie music."
"Bedroom Community have, quietly and modestly, managed to assemble a wonderfully inventive ensemble of artists."
 Is Bedroom Community Iceland's Best Label?

References

External links
 Bedroom Community 
 YouTube
 Interview with Valgeir Sigurðsson and Ben Frost.

Icelandic record labels
Record labels established in 2006